Cape Town  International Airport  is the primary international airport serving the city of Cape Town, and is the second-busiest airport in South Africa and fourth-busiest in Africa. Cape Town International Airport is the only airport in the Cape Town metropolitan area that offers scheduled passenger services. The airport has domestic and international terminals, linked by a common central terminal.

The airport has direct flights from South Africa's other two main urban areas, Johannesburg and Durban, as well as flights to smaller centers in South Africa.  Internationally, it has direct flights to several destinations in Africa, the Middle East, Asia, Europe and the United States.  The air route between Cape Town and Johannesburg was the world's ninth-busiest air route in 2011 with an estimated 4.5 million passengers.

History
D.F. Malan Airport was opened in 1954, a year after Jan Smuts Airport (now OR Tambo International Airport) on the Witwatersrand, near Johannesburg, opened. The airport replaced Cape Town's previous airport, Wingfield Aerodrome. Originally named after the then South African prime minister, it initially offered two international flights: a direct flight to Britain and a second flight to Britain via Johannesburg. By 1977, the airport had acquired nonstop connectivity with South America, with Varig operating flights to Rio de Janeiro.

With the fall of apartheid in the early 1990s, ownership of the airport was transferred from the state to the newly formed Airports Company South Africa, and the airport was renamed to the politically neutral Cape Town International Airport. Additionally, South African Airways launched a route to North America in 1992, linking Cape Town to Miami. The destination of this flight later changed to Fort Lauderdale and finally to Atlanta.

The first years of the twenty-first century saw tremendous growth at the airport; from handling 6.2 million passengers per annum in 2004–05, the airport peaked at 8.4 million passengers per annum in 2007–08 before falling back to 7.8 million in 2008–09. On the other hand, South African Airways had terminated the flight to Atlanta by 2006.  In 2011, Malaysia Airlines withdrew its service to Buenos Aires, which had begun in the 1990s.

In 2016, the airport saw a 29% increase in international arrivals; 2016 also saw the airport handle 10 million passengers per annum. Three years later, a new connection to North America commenced upon United Airlines' arrival from Newark.

Name change
On 16 April 2018, it was reported in the Cape Times that the Minister of Transport, Bonginkosi Nzimande, had directed ACSA on 22 March 2018 to change the name of Cape Town International Airport to Nelson Mandela International Airport. The name change was discussed and as yet no name change had been published in the Government Gazette.

On 5 March 2019, the EFF filed a motion in Parliament calling for the renaming of Cape Town International Airport after anti-apartheid icon Winnie Madikizela-Mandela. While members of the Khoi community pushed for the airport to be named after the! Uriǁ'aeǀona translator and cultural icon Krotoa. One of the arguments of the opposition was that Parliament is not constitutionally empowered to resolve any name change and that it was the responsibility of the South African Geographical Names Council (SAGNC) to deal with name changes. The motion was not successful.

Until a name change has been published in the Government Gazette, it remains Cape Town International Airport. In February 2021, the Cape Times reported that the proposed name change of the airport had been "quietly ditched".

Developments

In preparation for the 2010 FIFA World Cup, Cape Town International Airport was extensively expanded and renovated. The main focus was the development of a Central Terminal Building at a cost of R1.6 billion, which linked the formerly separate domestic and international terminals and provided a common check-in area. The departures level of the Central Terminal opened in November 2009, with the entire building opened in April 2010.

Apart from the now-completed 2010 expansion project, it had been proposed that a second runway for large aircraft be constructed at the airport, to be completed by 2015. However, this second runway has not been constructed. In May 2015, Airports Company South Africa announced a R7.7 billion expansion for the airport. The expansion includes the upgrades of the Domestic & International terminals. The expansion has been postponed indefinitely due to the drop in passenger numbers due to the global COVID-19 pandemic from 2020.

Facilities

Terminals
The airport has two terminals linked together by one central terminal.

Central Terminal
The terminal building has a split-level design, with departures located on the upper floors and arrivals in the lower floors; an elevated roadway system provides vehicular access to both departures and arrivals levels. All check-in takes place within the Central Terminal Building, which contains 120 check-in desks and 20 self-service kiosks. Passengers then pass through a consolidated security screening area before dividing. Passengers flying internationally head to the northern part of the airport which is the international terminal, and passengers flying to other parts of South Africa head to the southern part of the airport to the domestic terminal.

The terminal has 10 air bridges, evenly split between domestic and international usage. Sections of lower levels of the domestic and international terminals are used for transporting passengers via bus to and from remotely parked aircraft.

Arriving passengers collect luggage in the old sections of their respective terminals, before proceeding through new passageways to the new Central Terminal Building. The terminal contains an automated baggage handling system, capable of handling 30,000 bags per hour.

Retail outlets are located on the lower (arrivals) level of the terminal at landside, as well as airside at the departure gates. Retail outlets are diverse, including foreign exchange services, bookstores, clothing retailers, grocery stores, souvenir outlets and duty-free in international departures. The restaurant level overlooks the airside of the terminal, where a glass curtain wall separates the patrons from the planes three stories below. On the 4th floor is where the airport's lounges are situated. The Bidvest, as well as South African Airways lounges, can be found here.

International Terminal
The international terminal is located on the northern side of the airport. Customs and Immigration facilities, lounges, duty-free shops, restaurants, prayer rooms, conference rooms, airline offices, and chapels are located in the terminal.

Domestic Terminal
Located on the southern side of the airport, it has the same facilities as the international terminal, with the exception of Immigration facilities.

Other facilities
There are two hotels located within the airport precinct: Hotel Verde, a four-star hotel owned by Bon Hotels and ranked as "Africa's greenest hotel", and the other being Road Lodge, a budget hotel owned by the City Lodge hotel chain group. An ExecuJet facility is located near the southern end of the main runway and caters for business jets. The airport also has a MyCiti BRT station which connects across the whole of Cape Town.

Airlines and destinations

Passenger

Notes
  Kenya Airways flights to Nairobi operate via Victoria Falls and Livingstone.
  Flights to and from Kigali have a stopover in Harare. The airline has full traffic rights to transport passengers between Harare and Cape Town.
  This flight operates via Johannesburg. However, this carrier does not have rights to transport passengers solely between Cape Town and Johannesburg.
 Some Delta Air Lines flights from Atlanta to Cape Town operate via Johannesburg. However, all flights from Cape Town to Atlanta are nonstop.

Cargo

Statistics

Passenger traffic

Aircraft movements

Ground transport

Car
The airport can also be indirectly accessed from the R300 freeway via the M12, M10 and M22.

The airport provides approximately 1,424 parking spaces in the general parking area, and 1,748 parking bays in the multi-storey car park located near the domestic terminal. A new car park opened in 2010, which is located near the international terminal and provides an additional 4,000 parking spaces. The airport also offers a valet parking service.

Public transport
The MyCiTi bus rapid transit system provides a shuttle service connecting the airport with the Civic Centre bus station in the city centre. Buses depart every twenty minutes from 04:20-22:00. Transport to and from the airport is also provided by metered taxis and various private shuttle companies.

Rail link
There is no direct rail access to Cape Town International Airport. The Passenger Rail Agency of South Africa has proposed a  rail link between the airport and Cape Town's existing suburban rail network.

Accolades
 2009 – Best Airport in Africa award by Skytrax, ahead of Durban International Airport and OR Tambo International Airport.
 2011 – Best Airport in Africa of the Airport Service Quality Awards by Airports Council International
 2012 – Best Airport in Africa award by Skytrax
 2013 – Best Airport Staff in Africa award by Skytrax
 2013 – Best Airport in Africa award by Skytrax
 2016 – Best Airport in Africa award by Skytrax
 2017 – Best Airport in Africa award by Skytrax
 2018 – Best Airport in Africa award by Skytrax
 2019 – Best Airport in Africa award by Skytrax
 2020 – Best Airport in Africa award by Skytrax
 2021 – Best Airport in Africa award by Skytrax
 2021 – Best Airport Staff in Africa award by Skytrax

See also
 List of South African airports by passenger movements

Notes

References

External links

 Official website

Transport in Cape Town
Airports in South Africa
Airports established in 1954
1954 establishments in South Africa